General (Gen) is a four-star commissioned officer rank in the Swedish Army, Swedish Air Force and Swedish Amphibious Corps. General ranks immediately above lieutenant general and is equivalent to admiral in the Swedish Navy. It is held by the Supreme Commander of the Swedish Armed Forces and the monarch.

History
In Sweden, the rank of general was a three-star rank until 1972 when it became a four-star rank. Historically, during the 20th century, lieutenant generals were promoted one grade upon retirement to full general. According to current practice only royals and the Supreme Commander of the Swedish Armed Forces, if he were to come from the Swedish Army, Swedish Air Force or the Swedish Amphibious Corps can hold the rank of a full, four-star, general in Sweden.

In 2009, the Swedish Armed Forces reported that General Håkan Syrén would retain his rank during his time as Chairman of the European Union Military Committee (2009–2012), which for the first time gave Sweden three active four-star generals; former Supreme Commander, General Håkan Syrén (2004–2012), current Supreme Commander, General Sverker Göranson (2009–2015) and Carl XVI Gustaf (1973–present). This is correct since the rank of general since 1972 is a four-star rank. However, before 1972, the rank of general was a three-star rank, and between 1940 and 1941 Sweden had five active three-star generals; the Supreme Commander, General Olof Thörnell (1940–1944), General Oscar Nygren (1939–1941), King Gustaf V (1898–1950), Crown Prince Gustaf Adolf (1932–1973) and Prince Carl, Duke of Västergötland (1908–1951).

Following a proposal from the Swedish Armed Forces, the Government of Sweden decides on employment as a general.

In everyday speech, generals of all ranks are addressed as generals.

Rank insignia

Collar patches

Shoulder marks

Sleeve insignias

Amphibious Corps and Coastal Artillery

Air Force

Army

Hats

Personal flags
The command flag of a general (and an admiral) is a double swallowtailed Swedish flag. In the first blue field 4 five-pointed white stars placed two over two.

List of generals

The following have been promoted to the rank of general in the Swedish Armed Forces between 1900 and :

Footnotes

References

Notes

Print

Military ranks of the Swedish Army
Military ranks of the Swedish Air Force